is a neighborhood in Hatsukaichi, Hiroshima, Japan. It was a part of the town of Ōno until 2005 when the town was annexed by the city of Hatsukaichi.

It is located on Route 2 from Osaka to Fukuoka, and is served by the JR West train station Miyajimaguchi Station and Hiroden-miyajima-guchi Station on the Hiroden Miyajima Line from Hiroshima.

The JR Miyajima Ferry terminus and private ferry terminus are a short walk from the station, and provide access to the island of Miyajima, also now a part of Hatsukaichi.

Geography of Hiroshima Prefecture

ja:宮島口駅